West Stockbridge is a town in Berkshire County, Massachusetts, United States. The town had a population of 1,343 at the time of the 2020 United States Census. It is part of the Pittsfield, Massachusetts Metropolitan Statistical Area.

History 
West Stockbridge was first settled in 1766 and was officially incorporated in 1774. The town grew out of Stockbridge, formerly known as Indiantown, and was originally called Queensborough. The area was part of the disputed border between Massachusetts and New York, which eventually left the town in its current state. The town grew as five separate villages (West Center, West Stockbridge, Freedleyville, Rockdale and Williamsville), with West Stockbridge growing the largest because of the railroad, which hauled iron ore and marble. The town had an ironworks in Williamsville, founded by Colonel Elijah Williams, and the furnace smokestack is the only part which remains of the works.

Geography

West Stockbridge is bordered on the north by Richmond, on the east by Stockbridge, on the south by Great Barrington, on the southwest by Alford, and on the west by Austerlitz and Canaan, New York.

West Stockbridge is situated along the Williams River, a marshy tributary of the Housatonic River. To the northeast, West Stockbridge Mountain lies along the Stockbridge town line. To the southwest, Tom Ball Mountain rises above the Alford town line, and Harvey Mountain rises on the state border. Maple Hill rises in the center of town, and is covered by a wildlife management area.

Interstate 90, the Massachusetts Turnpike, crosses into the state in West Stockbridge. Exit 1 , which solely consists of a western exit and eastern entrance, is located near the center of town, near the southern junction of Route 41 and Route 102, which begins on the state border in the village of State Line.

An abandoned rail line crosses through town, adjoining the active line in State Line and heading southward through town towards Great Barrington. The nearest regional transportation services can all be reached in Pittsfield, including bus, Amtrak and air service. The nearest national air service is at Albany International Airport in New York.

Demographics

As of the census of 2000, there were 1,416 people, 601 households, and 406 families residing in the town. By population, West Stockbridge ranks 18th out of the 32 cities and towns in Berkshire County, and 310th out of 351 cities and towns in Massachusetts. The racial makeup of the town was 98.09% White, 0.28% African American, 0.07% Native American, 0.92% Asian, 0.07% from other races, and 0.56% from two or more races. Hispanic or Latino of any race were 0.85% of the population.

There were 601 households, out of which 28.1% had children under the age of 18 living with them, 56.9% were married couples living together, 8.5% had a female householder with no husband present, and 32.4% were non-families. 27.0% of all households were made up of individuals, and 13.1% had someone living alone who was 65 years of age or older.  The average household size was 2.35 and the average family size was 2.86.

In the town, the population was spread out, with 21.8% under the age of 18, 4.9% from 18 to 24, 24.8% from 25 to 44, 31.6% from 45 to 64, and 16.9% who were 65 years of age or older.  The median age was 44 years. For every 100 females, there were 96.1 males.  For every 100 females age 18 and over, there were 92.2 males.

The median income for a household in the town was $120,000, and the median income for a family was $100,000. Males had a median income of $95,000 versus $79,000 for females. The per capita income for the town was $90,000.  About 1.8% of families and 4.3% of the population were below the poverty line, including 1.3% of those under age 18 and 3.8% of those age 65 or over.

Government

West Stockbridge employs the open town meeting form of government, and is led by a Select Board and a Town Administrator. The town has its own services, including police, fire and public works, as well as a post office. The town operates a library four days a week, which is connected to the regional library systems.

On the state level, West Stockbridge is represented in the Massachusetts House of Representatives by the Fourth Berkshire district, which covers southern Berkshire County, as well as the westernmost towns in Hampden County. In the Massachusetts Senate, the town is represented by the Berkshire, Hampshire and Franklin district, which includes all of Berkshire County and western Hampshire and Franklin counties. The town is patrolled by the First (Lee) Station of Barracks "B" of the Massachusetts State Police.

On the national level, West Stockbridge is represented in the United States House of Representatives as part of Massachusetts's 1st congressional district, and is represented by Richard Neal. Massachusetts is currently represented in the United States Senate by senior Senator Elizabeth Warren and junior Senator Ed Markey.

Education

West Stockbridge is a member of the Berkshire Hills Regional School District, along with Stockbridge and Great Barrington, which hosts all the district's schools. All students in the district attend the Muddy Brook Regional School from pre-kindergarten through fourth grades. Middle school students attend Monument Valley Regional Middle School, and high school students attend Monument Mountain Regional High School. Prior to creation of the regional district, high school students in West Stockbridge attended the former Williams High School in Stockbridge. There are private schools located in the nearby towns of Great Barrington and Lenox which are also open to students from the town.

The nearest community college is the South County branch of Berkshire Community College in Great Barrington. The nearest state college is Massachusetts College of Liberal Arts in North Adams, and the nearest state university is the University of Massachusetts Amherst. The nearest private college is Bard College at Simon's Rock, also in Great Barrington.

Culture
Turn Park Art Space, an art museum, sculpture park, and performance space, opened on the site of a former limestone and marble quarry in May 2017.

References

External links

Town of West Stockbridge official website
West Stockbridge community website
Berkshire Hills Regional School District

 
Towns in Berkshire County, Massachusetts
Towns in Massachusetts